X (sometimes called the "X0 events") is an annually held trade show hosted by Microsoft, showcasing its Xbox portfolio of hardware, software, and services.

List of events

References

External links

Recurring events established in 2018
Video game trade shows
Xbox One